Ou cuisine, alternatively known as Wenzhou cuisine, is one of the four schools of Zhejiang cuisine, whereas Zhejiang cuisine is one of the eight major cuisines in China. The ancient name of Wenzhou is called DongOu. After the founding of the People’s Republic of China, in order to improve the popularity of Wenzhou cuisine, catering experts has renamed the cuisine with its ancient name, as “Ou cai”. The major elements in ou cuisine are seafood, which tastes fresh, light, and not bland. During the cooking process, it emphasizes "two light and a heavy," that is, light oil, light thickening, and heavy knife action, and it has a noticeable distinctive style.

Origin 
According to a historical Records Huozhi Biography, "In the land of Chu and Yue, rice and fish, fruits, vegetables, and clams..." It demonstrates that people at the period not only cooked fish soup using raw fish but also ate "fruit and veggies with clams." "People in the southeast consume aquatic fish, mussels, snails, and clams as delicacy, but don't recognize it's fishy," according to Zhang Hua's "Natural History." "The Beauty of Food" and "Qiou Wen Mirage" are references to the people of Ouyue at the period, who lived off snakes and clams and believed them to be high-quality treasures. The dietary practices were further developed and enhanced, and cuisine was gradually evolved, which is now known as Ou cuisine. (simplified Chinese: 史记·货殖传》载)

Notable Dishes 
In order to promote the construction of "Poetic Painting Zhejiang & Hundred counties and thousand bowls" (simplified Chinese: 诗画浙江·百县千碗), recently, hosted by Wenzhou Culture, Radio, Film and Tourism Bureau, Wenzhou Restaurant and Catering Industry Association, the 2021 "hundred counties and thousand bowls - Ou cuisine top ten series of dishes" selection results are available. There were a total of evaluation of 2021 "Ou cuisine top ten hot dishes" "Ou cuisine top ten cold dishes" "Ou cuisine top ten snacks" "Ou cuisine top ten desserts " and "Ou cuisine top ten fashion dishes".

References 

Chinese cuisine